"Jackals and Arabs" (German: "Schakale und Araber") is a short story by Franz Kafka, written and published in 1917.  The story was first published by Martin Buber in the German monthly Der Jude. It appeared again in the collection Ein Landarzt (A Country Doctor) in 1919.

Plot
A European traveler from the North, accompanied by Arab guides, is camped in the desert. When night falls, and the Arabs are at a distance, the traveler is accosted by talking jackals.  The jackals speak of an age-old hatred for Arabs, whom they associate with uncleanliness. They relate a belief passed down from their ancestors, that a man such as the protagonist would be the one to "end the quarrel which divides the world in two". The jackals attempt to enlist the traveler's assistance in destroying them, offering him old rusted scissors with which to slit the throats of the Arabs.

At this moment an Arab happens upon the discussion, and cracks his whip, "laughing cheerfully". He declares the fondness of Arabs for jackals, and the Arabs bring out the carcass of a camel that had died in the night. The jackals begin to feast on it uncontrollably, and the Arab whips several of them as they tear at the flesh of the carcass, until the European interferes. The Arab agrees to stop, and the story ends:  "We’ll leave them to their calling.  Besides, it’s time to break camp.  You’ve seen them.  Wonderful creatures, aren’t they?  And how they hate us.”

Analysis
Walter Herbert Sokel describes the role of the European as a Messiah figure to the jackals, observing that the jackals at times refer to the protagonist with the words "Oh lord" and "oh dear lord".  The jackals' need for a Messiah is an "admission of helplessness",  which ultimately "links the parasitic with the religious."  Sokel finds Kafka's tale reminiscent of Nietzsche's On the Genealogy of Morality:

The sovereignly cheerful mockery and the ultimately good-natured tolerance exercised by the contemptuously benevolent figure of the Arab stands in remarkable contrast to the irrational and murderous hatred of the ascetic spiritualist. Evil, the monstrous product of impotent hate, exists only for the ascetics, the jackals. "The hell" they see in the Arabs is their point of view, their fabrication. For the dominant Arabs, who, thanks to their strength, feel secure and free from jealousy, there is no evil. Their archenemies are nothing more than cause for amused astonishment.

On the Genealogy of Morality features a parable of its own, in which vengeful lambs condemn birds of prey as evil; the birds of prey, rather than reciprocating this hatred, suggest that they love the lambs—in part because "there is nothing tastier".

Noting that "Jackals and Arabs" was initially published in a Zionist magazine, some observers have suggested that the jackals may represent Orthodox Jews, who looked to a Messiah for salvation. This perspective posits a critical Zionist perspective of Western Jewry: "As parasitic animals who rely on others to provide their food, they typify the lack of self-reliance ascribed by Zionists to Western Jews." The jackals' inability to kill for food on their own has been argued to be suggestive of Jewish ritual practices. The reading of jackals as Jews has been taken up by other critics as an allegory of Jewish-Arab relations, Kafka "caricaturing the concept of the Chosen People who appear as intolerant of the Arab culture as the Arab culture is of them."

Gregory Triffit has suggested that to attempt to "find sources" for Kafka's tale is a futile endeavor, owing to the "very multiplicity of equally valid or invalid equivalents".

Adaptations

 Shakale und Araber - a short movie directed by the German-speaking French film maker Jean-Marie Straub in 2011 (with Barbara Ulrich, Giorgio Passerone, Jubarite Semaran).

References

External links

The original text of "Schakale und Araber":
First page 
Second page 
Third page 
English translation

Jackals and Arabs
Jackals and Arabs
Works originally published in German magazines